Prestonfield may refer to the one of following:

Prestonfield, Edinburgh, an area of the city of Edinburgh, Scotland
Prestonfield, Linlithgow, a football stadium in Linlithgow, Scotland, home of Linlithgow Rose F.C.

See also
Prestonfield House, a boutique hotel in Prestonfield, Edinburgh.